"Writer's Block" is a single by English artist Just Jack which was recorded in 2006. It reached 74 in the UK Singles Chart in June 2007.

The spoken word sample at the beginning of the track is taken from an interview given by Mary Rand to the BBC at the 1964 Summer Olympics in Tokyo.

Track listings
CD single
 "Writer's Block"
 "Starz in Their Eyes" (Acoustic)

References

External links
 

2007 singles
Just Jack songs
2006 songs
Mercury Records singles